Maux may refer to:

People
  (1901-1950), French engineer
 Inge Maux (born 1944), Austrian actress
 Mme de Maux (1725-?), French 18th century personality
  (1893–1971), Austrian composer

Places
 Maux, Nièvre, France